Mantas Dilys (born 30 March 1984) is a Lithuanian triple jumper, who also competed as decathlete. His personal record is 16.68 metres, reached at 2009 in Kaunas.

He represented Lithuania in 2009 World Championships in Athletics without reaching the final.

Achievements

In addition, he is a three times National Championships medalist.

References

1984 births
Living people
Lithuanian decathletes
Lithuanian male triple jumpers